There were multiple major battles fought in the vicinity of the town of Brody in what is now Ukraine:

 Battle of Brody (1863), part of the January Uprising
 Battle of Brody (1920) during the Polish–Bolshevik War
 Battle of Brody (1941) during Operation Barbarossa
 Battle of Brody (1944) during the Lvov–Sandomierz Offensive of World War II